Choi Yu-jung (born 27 March 2000) is a South Korean ice hockey player.

Life
Choi was born in 2000 and took up ice hockey when she was nine as her father who was a teacher was starting a team at her school.

She competed in the 2018 Winter Olympics as part of a unified team of 35 players drawn from both North and South Korea. The team's coach was Sarah Murray and the team was in Group B competing against Switzerland, Japan and Sweden.

References

2000 births
Living people
Ice hockey players at the 2018 Winter Olympics
Olympic ice hockey players of South Korea
South Korean women's ice hockey forwards
Winter Olympics competitors for Korea
Ice hockey players at the 2017 Asian Winter Games